Album recorded by female Japanese pop artist Watanabe Misato. It was released on November 23, 2005 by Sony Music Entertainment.

Track listings

Melody
Tomato
Kiss from a rose
Oh! Hardest night
Precious Love
Live for today! -Anata to Ikite yuku- (=-I shall live with you-)
Ren-ai to Coffee to. (=Love, Coffee and...)
MUSIC FLOWER
Anata no Me Anata no Te (=Your Eyes Your Hands)
No Side
Yume no Aida (=In Dreams)

External links
Sony Music Entertainment - Official site for Watanabe Misato. 
Album Page - Direct link to page with song listing and music samples.

2005 albums
Misato Watanabe albums